Whatever is a 1998 independent teen drama film written and directed by Susan Skoog, about a high school senior's angst in the early 1980s in suburban Northern New Jersey and about her future as an art student with an urge to attend Cooper Union across the Hudson in New York City. The film stars Liza Weil (herself a native of Passaic) in her first major role, along with Chad Morgan and Frederic Forrest.

The film was released by Sony Pictures Classics on July 10, 1998, and was filmed on location using Super 16 film in Skoog's hometown of Red Bank, New Jersey for some scenes, along with Cooper Union in New York, with most principal photography occurring in Wheeling, West Virginia. The 16 mm original print was eventually converted to traditional theatrical 35 mm film presentation. After its original 1999 VHS release, it did not return to home video until the mid-2010s, when Sony Pictures Home Entertainment released it digitally to online video platforms for online sale, along with a limited period on manufacture-on-demand DVD via the Warner Archive.

References

External links 
 
 
 

1998 films
1998 independent films
1990s teen drama films
American teen drama films
American coming-of-age films
Sony Pictures Classics films
Films shot in New Jersey
Films shot in West Virginia
Films set in New Jersey
1998 drama films
1990s American films